The women's 3 metre springboard, also reported as springboard diving, was one of four diving events on the diving at the 1932 Summer Olympics programme. For the first time, the competition was held exclusively from the 3 metre springboard. Divers performed three compulsory dives – running pike dive forward, standing backward straight somersault, running forward half-screw – and three dives of the competitor's choice (different from the compulsory) for a total of six dives. The competition was held on Wednesday 10 August 1932. Eight divers from six nations competed.

Results
Since there were only eight entries, instead of groups, a direct final was contested.

References

Sources
  

Women
1932
1932 in women's diving
Div